Carlos Enrique Rodado Noriega (born 20 September 1943) is a Colombian engineer and politician currently serving as Ambassador of Colombia to Argentina. He served as the 28th and 9th Minister of Mines and Energy of Colombia, first in the administration of President Julio César Turbay Ayala and again in the administration of President Juan Manuel Santos Calderón. Rodado, a civil engineer and economist, has also served as Ambassador of Colombia to Spain, President of Ecopetrol, Member of the Chamber of Representatives of Colombia, and as the 58th Governor of Atlántico.

On 20 September 2011, President Santos announced that Rodado would be stepping down as Minister of Mines and Energy to be replaced by Mauricio Cárdenas Santa María, and designated Rodado as new Ambassador of Colombia to Argentina. Rodado was sworn in by President Santos on 7 February 2012 at a ceremony at the Palace of Nariño, and presented his Letters of Credence to President Cristina Fernández on 11 April 2012 at an official ceremony at the Casa Rosada.

References

External links
 

1943 births
Living people
People from Atlántico Department
Colombian civil engineers
Colombian economists
University of Michigan alumni
Colombian Conservative Party politicians
Ministers of Mines and Energy of Colombia
Members of the Chamber of Representatives of Colombia
Governors of Atlántico Department
Ambassadors of Colombia to Spain
Ambassadors of Colombia to Argentina